Live in Toronto Canada, is the second live album by the American rock band Ween, released in 2001 on their own Chocodog label.   It was recorded during the now legendary tour with Bobby Ogdin and the Shit Creek Boys on October 23, 1996, at the Phoenix Theatre in Toronto, Ontario.  The setlist is divided evenly between 12 Golden Country Greats tunes and previous fan favorites such as "Push th' Little Daisies" and "Buenas Tardes Amigo".  The album exemplifies the Ween live experience, drunkenness and all. The album was reissued on vinyl in 2018 by Schnitzel Records.

Track listing
All songs by Ween, except "Piano Man" by Billy Joel.

Cover art

The cover art is a parody of the 1964 Frank Sinatra/Count Basie album It Might as Well Be Swing.

References 

2001 live albums
Ween live albums